Leland Grove is a city in Sangamon County, Illinois, United States, located adjacent to Springfield. It is part of the Springfield Metropolitan Statistical Area. The population was 1,503 at the 2010 census.

Geography

Demographics

As of the census of 2000, there were 1,592 people, 693 households, and 501 families residing in the city. The racial makeup of the city was 97.30% White, 0.44% African American, 0.13% Native American, 0.88% Asian, 0.31% from other races, and 0.94% from two or more races. Hispanic or Latino of any race were 1.01% of the population.

There were 693 households, out of which 25.7% had children under the age of 18 living with them, 63.5% were married couples living together, 7.4% had a female householder with no husband present, and 27.7% were non-families. 24.4% of all households were made up of individuals, and 11.1% had someone living alone who was 65 years of age or older. The average household size was 2.30 and the average family size was 2.73.

In the city the population was spread out, with 21.0% under the age of 18, 3.5% from 18 to 24, 20.9% from 25 to 44, 33.7% from 45 to 64, and 20.8% who were 65 years of age or older. The median age was 47 years. For every 100 females, there were 85.1 males. For every 100 females age 18 and over, there were 84.9 males.

The median income for a household in the city was $75,437, and the median income for a family was $92,245. Males had a median income of $62,308 versus $45,673 for females. The per capita income for the city was $51,714.  It has the highest per-capita income of any city outside the Chicago metropolitan area. None of the families and 2.7% of the population were living below the poverty line, including no under eighteens and 5.0% of those over 64.

References

Cities in Sangamon County, Illinois
Cities in Illinois